Telecommunications in Croatia covers fixed and mobile telephones, radio, television, and the Internet.

Telephones

 Main lines in use: 1.9 million (2009).
 Mobile cellular: 6.0 million (2009).
 Mobile operators:
Hrvatski Telekom (prefixes +38598, +38599; GSM 900 MHz and 1800 MHz, UMTS 2100 MHz and 900 MHz, LTE 800 MHz and 1800 MHz, 2,273,000 users as at December 2018)
 A1 (prefix +38591; GSM 900 MHz and 1800 MHz, UMTS 2100 MHz and 900 MHz, LTE 800 MHz, 1800 MHz and 2600 MHz, 2,100,000 users)
 Telemach (prefix +38595; GSM 1800 MHz, UMTS 2100 MHz and 900 MHz, 897,000 users at the end of 2018)
 Mobile virtual network operator:
bonbon (prefix +385977 and +385976; uses Hrvatski Telekom's network)
 Tomato (prefix +38592; uses A1 Hrvatska's network)
 Telephone system (2015):
domestic:
 all local lines are digital;
 main operator: Hrvatski Telekom (owned by Deutsche Telekom);
 other operators: Iskon, Optima Telekom.
 international:
 country code - +385
 digital international service is provided through the main switch in Zagreb;
 Croatia participates in the Trans-Asia-Europe (TEL) fiber-optic project, which consists of two fiber-optic trunk connections with Slovenia and a fiber-optic trunk line from Rijeka to Split and Dubrovnik;
 Croatia is also investing in ADRIA 1, a joint fiber-optic project with Germany, Albania, and Greece.

Radio and television

 Radio broadcast stations: FM 150 (May 2020).
 Radios: 3.5 million (2006).
 Television free-to-air terrestrial stations: 31 (June 2020).
 Televisions: 3.2 million (2006).

Internet

 Top-level domain: .hr, administered by the Croatian Academic and Research Network (CARNET).
 Internet users: 
 2.8 million users, 80th in the world; 63.0% of the population, 59th in the world (2012);
 2.2 million users (2009).
 Fixed broadband: 909,090 subscriptions, 58th in the world; 20.3% of the population, 48th in the world (2012).
 Wireless broadband: 2.3 million subscribers, 60th in the world; 52.3% of the population, 26th in the world (2012).
 Internet hosts: 729,420 hosts, 50th in the world (2012).
 IPv4: 2.0 million addresses allocated, less than 0.05% of the world total, 455.9 addresses per 1000 people (2012).
 Internet Service Providers (ISPs): 41 (2006).

See also

 Croatia
 List of radio stations in Croatia

References

External links
 Hrvatski Telekom
 A1
 Telemach
 Iskon
 Optima Telekom
 Tomato
 bonbon
 Telekom: Croatian telecommunication agency